The Pizzaro class was a class of eight escort vessels built for the Spanish Navy in the 1940s. Built at Ferrol, they were completed in 1946–1950 rated as gunboats, and were redesignated as frigates in 1959. They started to be withdrawn from use in 1968, with the last of the class, Vincente Yañez Pinzon,  stricken in 1982.

Design
The Pizarro class were based on the s, two of which were built for the Spanish Navy, launched in 1939–40 and completed in 1942–43.  While the Eolo class were designed to combine the role of minelaying and escort, the Pizarros were more specialist escort vessels, with a heavy gun armament.

Displacement was  standard and  full load. Two Yarrow boilers fed steam to two sets of Parsons geared steam turbines.

The ships' main gun armament consisted of six  guns in three twin mounts, with one forward and two aft. Eight  and six  guns comprised the close-in anti-aircraft armament. Some of the class (including Pizarro, Vasco Núñez de Balboa and Vicente Yáñez Pinzón) were originally armed with two  anti-aircraft guns instead of the 120 mm guns before being rearmed with the intended armament. Anti-submarine armament consisted of four depth charge throwers, and up to 30 naval mines could be carried. The ships had a crew of 250.

Legazpi and Vicente Yáñez Pinzón were modernised in 1960 as part of a major programme of modernising ships of the Spanish Navy. The two ships were completely re-armed, with a gun armament of two American  38 calibre dual purpose guns in two single mounts, with a close-in anti-aircraft armament of four  Bofors L/70 guns. Anti-submarine armament consisted of two racks for anti-submarine torpedoes (eight torpedoes were carried), two Hedgehog anti-submarine mortar batteries, eight depth-charge throwers and two depth-charge racks.

Service
The eight ships were all launched at the Sociedad Española de Construcción Naval (SECN) shipyard at Ferrol dockyard in August 1944. Financial problems in Francoist Spain delayed construction of the ships, which were completed from 1947 to 1951. They were initially rated as Cañoneros (gunboats) and were re-rated as Fragatas (frigates) in 1958.

Two ships were discarded in 1968, with most of the rest of the class stricken in the next few years. By 1978, only Vicente Yáñez Pinzón remained in service.  She remained in service until 1982.

Ships

Notes

Citations

References

Gunboats of the Spanish Navy